Nasrollah Jahangard (born 1958 in Tehran) is an Iranian politician currently serving as the deputy minister of ICT in Technology and Innovation.

In October 2000, Jahangard was nominated for Minister of Post, Telegraph and Telephone but legislators turned him down.

Back in 1997, he had been the Deputy Minister of Post, Telegraph & Telephone (PTT) for Development & Planning, that th ministry later renamed to Ministry of Communications and Information Technology. Also He was the secretary of the Supreme Council of ICT of Iran and President Mohammad Khatami's advisor and special envoy for ICT affairs.
He is a founding member of the Islamic Iran Participation Front and is member of its political office.

He led the team for planning and implementing Takfa (similar to a "national ICT agenda" in some other countries), the first Iranian comprehensive countrywide plan for ICT.  
He received his bachelor's degree in computer engineering from Shahid Beheshti University and from Amirkabir University of Technology, he earned his master's degree in system engineering.

Jahangard was among the leaders for the National Commission of Information Society and helped the Iranian delegation to take part in World Summit on the Information Society (WSIS) (Geneva 2003 and Tunis 2005).

He was elected as the Man of IT in Iran in March 2005 by CCW Magazine.

References

1958 births
Living people
Shahid Beheshti University alumni
Amirkabir University of Technology alumni
Iranian Vice Ministers
Islamic Iran Participation Front politicians
People from Tehran